Shahrak-e Igder (also Romanized as Shahrak-e Īgder; also known as Īgder) is a village in Bakan Rural District, Hasanabad District, Eqlid County, Fars Province, Iran. At the 2006 census, its population was 505, in 113 families.

References 

Populated places in Eqlid County